Tolimkhan, also rendered as Towlim Khan, may refer to:
 Tolimkhan-e Olya
 Tolimkhan-e Sofla